Scuticaria irwiniana is a species of orchid endemic to Brazil (Minas Gerais).

References 

  (1973) Bradea, Boletim do Herbarium Bradeanum 1 (31): 336.
  (2009) Epidendroideae (Part two). Genera Orchidacearum 5: 200 ff. Oxford University Press.

External links 

irwiniana
Endemic orchids of Brazil
Orchids of Minas Gerais